Ms. Jones to You is an album by vocalist Etta Jones which was recorded in 1976 and released on the Muse label.

Track listing
 "I'm Gonna Lock My Heart and Throw Away the Key" (Jimmy Eaton, Terry Shand) – 3:12
 "Gone Away" (Curtis Lewis, Gladys Hampton, Curley Hamner) – 5:40
 "The Second Time Around" (Jimmy Van Heusen, Sammy Cahn) – 4:00
 "If That's the Way You Feel" (Billy Eckstine, Gerald Valentine) – 3:50
 "Exactly Like You" (Jimmy McHugh, Dorothy Fields) – 4:50
 "I'm All for You" (Larry Wynn, Jerry Bresler) – 5:59
 "You'd Better Love Me" – 5:00

Personnel
Etta Jones – vocals
Houston Person – tenor saxophone
Walter Davis Jr.  – piano
Buster Williams – bass
Larry Killian – congas, percussion
Grady Tate – drums
Jimmy Ponder – guitar

References

Muse Records albums
Etta Jones albums
1977 albums